Alain Roux is a French historian, sinologist, university professor emeritus at the National Institute of Oriental Languages and Civilizations (Inalco).

His subjects of study concern China and in particular Chinese workers in the 20th century, Chinese political elites in Republican China.

Alain Roux obtained  l'agrégation d’histoire  in 1960, he has been professor emeritus since 2002.

His research has focused on the Chinese labor movement in Shanghai before the Communist Party came to power in 1949, Shanghainese society during the Kuomintang era, and the intellectual Qu Qiubai.

Regarding the book Le Singe et le Tigre : Mao, un destin chinois published in 2009, the sinologist Lucien Bianco indicates that this monumental biography of Mao Zedong "is not only very detailed, it is reliable, generally accurate and always impartial" .

Publications

Books 
 Le Singe et le Tigre: Mao, un destin chinois, Éditions Larousse, 2009. 1126 p 
 La Chine au XXe siècle. 4e éd., revue et complétée, Armand Colin, 2005. 248 p .
 Le Casse-tête chinois. Trente ans de Chine socialiste vus par un communiste français, Éditions sociales, 1980 
 Chiang Kaï-Shek. Le grand rival de Mao, Payet, 2016, 646 pages.
 with Xiaohong Xiao-Planes, Histoire de la République populaire de Chine, de Mao Zedong à Xi Jinping, Armand Colin, 2018, 352 p.

References 

China–France relations
French sinologists
Year of birth missing (living people)
Living people